Sphenospora kevorkianii is a plant pathogen infecting cattleyas.

References

Fungal plant pathogens and diseases
Orchid diseases
Pucciniales